Chicerea may refer to several villages in Romania:

 Chicerea, a village in Motoșeni Commune, Bacău County
 Chicerea, a village in Tomești Commune, Iași County
 Chicerea, a village in Stănița Commune, Neamț County